Demar Constantine Phillips (born 23 September 1983) is a Jamaican footballer who plays as a left wingback.

Early life 
Demar Phillips was born on 23 September 1983 in a small town in the district of St Thomas outside Kingston. He describes growing up in among deep poverty, saying he "knew what it was like to starve".

Club career

Waterhouse
After starting his youth career at York United in the St Thomas Parish leagues and Eastern Confederation Super League, Phillips made the move to Waterhouse Football Club, starting with their u21 team before becoming a senior team regular.

Stoke City
With reference from Jamaican teammate Ricardo Fuller to boss Tony Pulis, Phillips signed a three-year contract for Stoke City, on 31 August 2007 from Jamaican club Waterhouse, for an undisclosed fee. After appearing on the substitutes bench against Leicester City, Sheffield Wednesday, Crystal Palace and Scunthorpe United, Phillips finally made his first team debut on 10 November 2007 in the game against Sheffield United, in which he came on as a 78th-minute substitute.

Phillips made only two appearances for Stoke, however, and in the summer of 2008 joined Oldham Athletic on trial with a view to a season-long loan. Problems with obtaining a work permit saw this fall through and he returned to Stoke. He again struggled to force his way into the Premier side's first team squad and at the end of the transfer window in January 2009 he joined Norwegian side Aalesunds FK on a free transfer.

Aalesunds FK
Phillips made his Aalesund-debut on 15 March 2009, playing at left back against Tromsø IL. He played in the Norwegian Football Cup final as a substitute, which Aalesund won on penalties, one of which he scored. Phillips was named man of the match after scoring both goals in a 2–0 win against Hønefoss on 21 March 2010. On 20 August 2011, Phillips signed a new contract with Aalesunds FK until 2014.

Real Salt Lake
Phillips signed with Real Salt Lake of Major League Soccer in January 2015. He was released following the 2015 season. In January 2016, RSL re-signed Phillips for the 2016 season. At the conclusion of the 2018 season, RSL declined the 2019 contract option on Phillips.

Austin Bold FC
Phillips was signed by USL Championship club Austin Bold FC early in their inaugural season, on April 18, 2019.

International career
Phillips has appeared for the Jamaica national football team a total of 62 times scoring twelve goals. On 6 June 2011, Phillips scored the third goal in a 4–0 win. On 10 June 2011, Phillips scored a brace in a 2–0 win over Guatemala, being named man of the match.

Personal life 
Phillips has one daughter named Jadyn, who currently lives in Jamaica with her mother, who is a university employee. Phillips and Jadyn's mother are separated. Phillips is a devout Christian, himself stating that he devotes a considerable amount of time to prayer. He explained: "I pray to God a lot. In the morning and at night before I go to bed. When I step onto the pitch before a game, I stop before the sidelines, taking to the ground with my hands, before I do the sign of the cross and look up at the sky. Then I know that God will protect me during the game".

Career statistics

Club

International
Source:

Honours

 Jamaica
Caribbean Cup:
Winner:2008

 Waterhouse
Jamaica National Premier League:
Winner (1): 2006

 Aalesunds FK
Norwegian Football Cup:
Winner (2): 2009, 2011

References

External links

1983 births
Living people
Association football midfielders
Jamaica international footballers
Jamaican footballers
Waterhouse F.C. players
Stoke City F.C. players
Aalesunds FK players
Real Salt Lake players
Real Monarchs players
National Premier League players
English Football League players
Eliteserien players
Major League Soccer players
USL Championship players
2009 CONCACAF Gold Cup players
2011 CONCACAF Gold Cup players
2014 Caribbean Cup players
2015 CONCACAF Gold Cup players
Jamaican expatriate footballers
Expatriate footballers in England
Expatriate footballers in Norway
Expatriate soccer players in the United States
Jamaican expatriate sportspeople in England
Jamaican expatriate sportspeople in Norway
Austin Bold FC players